The S.G. Smith House is a historic house at 1937 Caldwell Street in Conway, Arkansas.  It is a two-story brick structure, with a hip roof, and a porte-cochere extending to the west, supported by Tuscan columns.  The main entrance is framed by Classical pillars supporting an entablature, and there is a round-arch window with narrow metal balcony to its right. The house was built about 1924 to a design by the Arkansas firm of Thompson and Harding.

The house was listed on the National Register of Historic Places in 1982.

See also
National Register of Historic Places listings in Faulkner County, Arkansas

References

Houses on the National Register of Historic Places in Arkansas
Colonial Revival architecture in Arkansas
Houses completed in 1924
Houses in Conway, Arkansas
Individually listed contributing properties to historic districts on the National Register in Arkansas
National Register of Historic Places in Faulkner County, Arkansas